Betty Ann Kane is a former American politician who served as an at-large member of the Council of the District of Columbia from 1979 to 1991. Kane later served as a commissioner on the District of Columbia Public Service Commission.

Kane was a non-resident elected city commissioner for Rehoboth Beach, Delaware, from 1996 to 2005.

Political career
Kane was elected to the D.C. school board in 1974. In 1978, at-large city council member Douglas E. Moore decided to run for council chairman rather than for reelection, and Kane took the opportunity to run for the seat he was vacating. She narrowly defeated H. R. Crawford in the Democratic primary and went on to win the general election. Kane was re-elected in 1982 and 1986.

In 1990, Kane ran for delegate to Congress, but lost in the primary to Eleanor Holmes Norton.

References

Members of the Council of the District of Columbia
Members of the District of Columbia Board of Education
Living people
Women city councillors in the District of Columbia
20th-century American politicians
20th-century American women politicians
21st-century American politicians
21st-century American women politicians
Women in Delaware politics
Year of birth missing (living people)
Middlebury College alumni
Yale University alumni